Frederick Lee Brock (born November 15, 1974) is a former American football wide receiver. He played for the Arizona Cardinals from 1997 to 1998 and for the New York/New Jersey Hitmen in 2001.

References

1974 births
Living people
American football wide receivers
Southern Miss Golden Eagles football players
Arizona Cardinals players
New York/New Jersey Hitmen players